Times Like These is the third album from the Christian country music band Austins Bridge. It was released on May 4, 2010.

Track listing

 "Angels" 
 "Mercy Never Leaves" 
 "There Is a God"
 "Quitters" 
 "Big Sky"
 "Times Like These"
 "Dash Between the Dates"
 "Love Is On the Way"
 "Hold on to Jesus"
 "Good Time"

Awards

The album was nominated for a GMA Dove Award for Country Album of the Year at the 42nd GMA Dove Awards.

References

External links 
 Austins Bridge Official Site
 Times Like These at Amazon.com
 Times Like These at ChristianBooks.com

2010 albums
Austins Bridge albums
Albums produced by Jay DeMarcus